Richard Charles Lucas (born 10 September 1925) is an Anglican evangelical cleric, best known for his long ministry at St Helen's Bishopsgate in London, England, and for his work as founder of the Proclamation Trust and the Cornhill Training Course.

Early life

Lucas was born on 10 September 1925 in Lewes, Sussex. He attended Radley College. He was converted to evangelical Christianity in 1941 under the camp ministry of E. J. H. Nash.  Lucas began university studies at Oxford, but left to serve in the Royal Navy during World War II. After the war, he continued his undergraduate studies at Trinity College, Cambridge (BA 1949, MA 1957).

Ordained ministry

Lucas completed ordination training at Ridley Hall, and was ordained in the Church of England as a Deacon in 1951, and then as a Priest in 1952. Lucas' first curacy was served as at St Nicholas' Church, Sevenoaks from 1951 to 1955, before he joined the staff of the Church Pastoral Aid Society from 1955 until 1961.

Lucas became Rector of St. Helen's Bishopsgate in 1961, and served the church as its Rector for thirty-seven years. Under his leadership, St. Helen's grew from a small  congregation of a few individuals to a large thriving church with a ministry to city workers, families, students and young professionals. He developed a reputation for strong Bible teaching and preaching.  He emerged as a widely respected evangelical speaker, particularly at the Keswick Convention. He was outspoken among his generation of evangelical ministers in encouraging systematic expositional preaching. With this in mind, Lucas was among those who established a popular and widely duplicated programme of training workshops for preachers.

In May 1986 Lucas founded the Proclamation Trust, the aim of which is to encourage ministry that seeks to "expound the Bible as God's Word for today", and remains active as a Trustee.

In 1991, in partnership with David Jackman, Lucas helped to form the Cornhill Training Course.  The course originally met for training in St Peter upon Cornhill, before moving to Borough to meet in office space on Borough High Street. Lucas is no longer part of the leadership team there.

Now in his nineties, Lucas still has an active and influential ministry, preaching and speaking at conferences in the UK and further afield. He is Rector Emeritus of St Helen's, where he returns each summer to preach.

Although prioritising preaching and teaching, Lucas is the author of a number of evangelical books and commentaries. With John Stott, J.I. Packer and others, Lucas was a key figure in shaping the conservative evangelical movement in the United Kingdom during the 20th century.

In 1995, a Festschrift was published in his honour. When God's Voice is Heard: The Power of Preaching included contributions from Peter Adam, D. A. Carson, John Chapman, Edmund Clowney, Peter Jensen, Phillip Jensen, and J. I. Packer.

Bibliography
Commentaries:
 Lucas, R. C. (1980). The Message of Colossians & Philemon (The Bible Speaks Today Series), Leicester: Inter-Varsity Press. 
 Lucas & Green (Dec 1995). The Message of 2 Peter and Jude (The Bible Speaks Today Series), Leicester: Inter-Varsity Press. 

Keswick paperbacks:
 Lucas, et al. (1978). The Gospel, the Spirit, the Church: Keswick ministry from John Stott, Dick Lucas, Ken Prior, Gilbert Kirby and others, UK: STL Books [for] Keswick Convention Council. 
 Lucas, et al. (Nov 1981). Purity and Power: Keswick Convention Ministry, 1981, UK: Send the Light Trust. 
 Lucas, et al. (Nov 1986). Rebuilding the Foundations (1986 Keswick Convention), UK: Send the Light. 

Other works:
 Lucas & Philip (1980). Teaching John: Unlocking the Gospel of John for the Expositor (Proclamation Trust Media), UK: Christian Focus Publications. 
 Jackopson & Lucas (April 1992). Good Morning, Disciple, UK: Zondervan. 
 Peter Adam (foreword by Lucas) (30 May 2004). Speaking God's Words: A Practical Theology of Preaching, UK: Regent College Publishing. 
 Green and Jackman (1995). When God's Voice is Heard: Essays on preaching presented to Dick Lucas (Leicester: IVP)

References

External links 
St Helen Bishopsgate
The Proclamation Trust

1925 births
Living people
Evangelical Anglican clergy
People from Lewes
Alumni of Trinity College, Cambridge
English evangelicals
21st-century English Anglican priests
Royal Navy personnel of World War II
Bible commentators
20th-century English Anglican priests